Amick is both a surname and a given name. Notable people with the name include:

Surname:

Bill Amick (1925-1995), American NASCAR driver
Eugene Earle Amick (1919-1942), United States Navy officer
George Amick (1924-1959), American racecar driver
Lyndon Amick (born 1977), American NASCAR driver
Mädchen Amick (born 1970), American actress
Red Amick (1929-1995), American racecar driver

Given name
Amick Byram (born 1955), American Gospel singer and tenor

See also
USS Amick (DE-168), a United States Navy destroyer escort of World War II
Aimak people of Afghanistan

Masculine given names